Ahmadabad Culture and Technology Complex ( – Mojatamʿ Kasht va ṣanʿat Aḩmadābād) is a cultural centre and village in Esmailabad Rural District of Bostan District of Baharestan County, Tehran province, Iran. At the 2006 National Census, its population was 35 in 10 households, when it was in Robat Karim County. The population at the 2011 census was below the reporting threshold, by which time the district, together with Golestan District, had been separated from the county and Baharestan County established. The latest census in 2016 showed a population of zero; it was the only village in its rural district.

References 

Baharestan County

Populated places in Tehran Province

Populated places in Baharestan County